Basauna is a small countryside village in Saharsa district of Bihar, India. It is 6 km from the district headquarters. It has five schools: a high school (which is a model school of the region), a girls' school, and three middle schools.Neighbouring villages are Dholi, Chainpur, Bharauli, Amarpur, Parminia, Siradeh, Dighia, Parari, and Bangaon.Main temples are the Mahadev mandir, Thakur wari, Hanuman mandir, Kali mandir, Dharmraj, and Devi sthan (in Diwari).Agriculture is the main occupation of this village. The main crops are rice, wheat, horse gram beans, and mung beans.The village has supplied a large number of its sons to serve in the army. Pt.Bhagirath Jha (Krishnatrae- Gotra, Andoli Bhusbare- Mool) was the influential first person of founders this village (Show Bans Briksha). 1. Bhagirathi Jha. 2. Kamal Jha. 3. Narendra Dutt Jha. 4. Hanuman Dutt Jha. 5. Babu Lal Jha. 6. Bhaijee Jha. 7. Abadh Narayan Jha. 8. Sub Narayan jha is a famous devotee of Loud Krishna. Maithili songs are popularly sung here. It is a village of secular character. The Hindu Muslim unity could be seen here at every steps. People has a great faith in Data \"Dharamraj\". Bhagait, a special type of songs.

Villages in Saharsa district